Greg Egan (born 20 August 1961) is an Australian science fiction writer and amateur mathematician, best known for his works of hard science fiction.  Egan has won multiple awards including the John W. Campbell Memorial Award, the Hugo Award, and the Locus Award.

Life and work
Egan holds a Bachelor of Science degree in Mathematics from the University of Western Australia.

He published his first work in 1983.  He specialises in hard science fiction stories with mathematical and quantum ontology themes, including the nature of consciousness. Other themes include genetics, simulated reality, posthumanism, mind uploading, sexuality, artificial intelligence, and the superiority of rational naturalism to religion. He often deals with complex technical material, like new physics and epistemology. He is a Hugo Award winner (with eight other works shortlisted for the Hugos) and has also won the John W. Campbell Memorial Award for Best Science Fiction Novel. His early stories feature strong elements of supernatural horror.

Egan's short stories have been published in a variety of genre magazines, including regular appearances in Interzone and Asimov's Science Fiction.

Mathematics
In 2018, Egan described a construction of superpermutations, thus giving an upper bound to their length. On 27 February 2019, using ideas developed by Robin Houston and others, Egan produced a superpermutation of n = 7 symbols of length 5906, breaking previous records.

Personal life
As of 2015, Egan lives in Perth. He is a vegetarian and an atheist.

Egan does not attend science fiction conventions, does not sign books, and has stated that he appears in no photographs on the web, though both SF fan sites and Google Search have at times mistakenly represented photos of other people with the same name as those of the writer.

Awards
 Permutation City: John W. Campbell Memorial Award (1995)
 Oceanic: Hugo Award, Locus Award, Asimov's Readers' Award (1999)
 Distress: Kurd-Laßwitz-Preis as Best Foreign Fiction (2000)

Egan's work has won the Japanese Seiun Award for best translated fiction seven times.

Teranesia was named the winner of the 2000 Ditmar Award for best novel, but Egan declined the award.

Works

Novels
 An Unusual Angle (1983), 
 Quarantine (1992), 
 Permutation City (1994), 
 Distress (1995), 
 Diaspora (1997), 
 Teranesia (1999), 
 Schild's Ladder (2002), 
 Incandescence (2008), 
 Zendegi (2010), 
 Dichronauts (2017), 
 The Book of All Skies (2021), 
 Scale (2023),

Orthogonal trilogy

 The Clockwork Rocket (2011), 
 The Eternal Flame (2012), 
 The Arrows of Time (2013),

Collections
Axiomatic (1995), 

Our Lady of Chernobyl (1995), 

Luminous (1998), 

Dark Integers and Other Stories (2008), 

Crystal Nights and Other Stories (2009), 

Oceanic (2009), 

The Best of Greg Egan (2019), 

Instantiation (2020)

Other short fiction

Excerpted
 Diaspora:
 "Orphanogenesis" in Interzone issue 123, September 1997

Academic papers
 An Efficient Algorithm for the Riemannian 10j Symbols by Dan Christensen and Greg Egan
 Asymptotics of 10j Symbols by John Baez, Dan Christensen and Greg Egan
 Conic-Helical Orbits of Planets around Binary Stars do not Exist by Greg Egan

Short movies
The production of a short film inspired by the story "Axiomatic" commenced in 2015, and the film was released online in October 2017.

Notes

References

External links

 
 
 Greg Egan at Library of Congress Authorities — with 11 catalog records
 Stories currently online at Free Speculative Fiction Online

1961 births
20th-century Australian male writers
20th-century Australian non-fiction writers
20th-century Australian novelists
20th-century Australian short story writers
21st-century Australian male writers
21st-century Australian non-fiction writers
21st-century Australian novelists
21st-century Australian short story writers
Amateur mathematicians
Australian atheists
Australian computer programmers
Australian horror writers
Australian human rights activists
Australian humanists
Australian male non-fiction writers
Australian male novelists
Australian mathematicians
Australian science fiction writers
Australian social commentators
Hugo Award-winning writers
Living people
University of Western Australia alumni
Writers about activism and social change
Writers from Perth, Western Australia